The Sicintine Range is a small subrange of the Skeena Mountains of the Interior Mountains, located south of the Skeena River and between the Sicintine River and Squingula River in northern British Columbia, Canada.

References

Sicintine Range in the Canadian Mountain Encyclopedia

Skeena Mountains